The Little Drummer Girl is a spy novel by British writer John le Carré, published in 1983. The story follows the manipulations of Martin Kurtz, an Israeli spymaster who intends to kill Khalil – a Palestinian terrorist who is bombing Jewish-related targets in Europe, particularly Germany – and Charlie, an English actress and double agent working on behalf of the Israelis.

Plot summary
Martin Kurtz, an Israeli spy working in a clandestine agency to allow plausible deniability for his superiors, recruits Charlie, a 
26-year-old radical left-wing English actress, as part of an elaborate scheme to discover the whereabouts of Khalil, a Palestinian terrorist. Joseph is Charlie's case officer. Khalil's younger brother Salim is abducted, interrogated, and killed by Kurtz's unit. Joseph impersonates Salim and travels through Europe with Charlie to make Khalil believe that Charlie and Salim are lovers. When Khalil discovers the affair and contacts Charlie, the Israelis are able to track him down.

Charlie is taken to Palestinian refugee camps to be trained as a bomber. She becomes more sympathetic to the Palestinian cause, and her divided loyalties bring her close to collapse. Charlie is sent on a mission to place a bomb at a lecture given by an Israeli moderate whose peace proposals are not to Khalil's liking. She carries out the mission under the Israelis' supervision. As a result, Joseph kills Khalil. Charlie subsequently has a mental breakdown caused by the strain of her mission and her own internal contradictions.

Adaptations

Film

The Little Drummer Girl was made into a feature film by George Roy Hill in 1984. It starred Diane Keaton as Charlie, Yorgo Voyagis as Joseph and Klaus Kinski as Kurtz. The film changes Charlie from an English twentysomething to a thirty-ish American. The film was released on DVD in 2006.

Television

A BBC/AMC serial adaptation was directed by Park Chan-wook, starring Florence Pugh, Alexander Skarsgård, and Michael Shannon. It also stars Clare Holman, Kate Sumpter, Charles Dance, Simona Brown, Michael Moshonov, Amir Khoury, and Max Irons; the series debuted in November 2018.

Reviews
Some reviewers described The Little Drummer Girl as transcending the spy novel genre. "The Little Drummer Girl is about spies", said William F. Buckley, writing in The New York Times, "as Madame Bovary is about adultery or Crime and Punishment about crime."

John Grisham, when queried by Bill Moyers, picked The Little Drummer Girl as one of his favourite novels, saying,
I love to read John le Carré, the British guy who's really probably my favourite writer. The Little Drummer Girl is a book I read about every four or five years. It's just so clever and brilliantly plotted. It's the kinda book – and his writing is off the charts, the way he expresses himself and the way he describes people and dialogue – and every time I read that book, it inspires me to be better.

Inspiration
Several real-life people have been mentioned as inspirations for the character of Charlie.

 John Le Carré's half-sister, Charlotte Cornwell, who was at the time a young actress with radical political views.

 American journalist, human rights advocate, and scholar of Arabic literature, Janet Lee Stevens, who was nicknamed "the little drummer girl" by Palestinians, and who gave John le Carré a tour of the Sabra and Shatila refugee camps in Lebanon.

References

External links
 

1983 British novels
British novels adapted into films
Hodder & Stoughton books
Novels about terrorism
Novels by John le Carré
British spy novels